Murder Prevention is a six-part British television crime drama series, written and created by Declan Croghan, that first broadcast on Five on 30 October 2004. Inspired by the real-life Homicide Prevention Unit within the Metropolitan Police, the series follows a unit headed up by DCI Patrick Goddard (Conor Mullen), who attempt to prevent murders from taking place by using modern scientific techniques and basic police instinct to gather enough evidence of intent to kill in order to arrest potential murderers before they offend. According to Croghan, "Murder Prevention is the first pre-crime drama ever, anywhere."

The series was produced by World Productions, who had previously produced BAFTA-award-winning police procedural television series The Cops. The series consists of three two-part stories, although later repeats edited the two-parters into three longer running episodes.

Also credited as principal members of the cast are Mark Lewis Jones as Mullen's second-in-command, DS Ray Lloyd; Sean Gallagher as Lloyd's wingman, DC Neil Stanton; Tom Brooke as DC Mark Rosen, a rookie profiler; and Michael Smiley and Sarah Smart as DCs Maurice Gibney and Karen Hughes. The series was due for release on DVD on 20 February 2006 via Target Media, although due to the company's collapse, was never released. The series remains unreleased on DVD.

Cast
 Conor Mullen as Patrick Goddard; detective chief inspector
 Mark Lewis Jones as Ray Lloyd; detective sergeant
 Sean Gallagher as Neil Stanton; detective constable
 Michael Smiley as Maurice Gibney; detective constable
 Sarah Smart as Karen Hughes; detective constable
 Tom Brooke as Mark Rosen; detective constable
 Badria Timimi as Louise Cole; legal counsel
 Peter Wight as Donald Winkler; commander
 Kerry Elkins as Kerry Phillips; forensic analyst

Episodes

References

External links
 
 Memorable TV - Murder Prevention

2004 British television series debuts
2004 British television series endings
2000s British drama television series
2000s British crime television series
2000s British television miniseries
English-language television shows
Channel 5 (British TV channel) original programming